Anouk Geurts (3 April 2000) is a Belgian sailor. She has competed in the 49 FX class at the 2020 Summer Olympics together with Isaura Maenhaut.

Career
Geurts started her career in the small Optimist class at the age of 10. She then progressed to the Laser 4.7 class, where she became Belgian and European champion in 2016.

Geurts and Maenhaut have sailed together since 2018. They finished 31st at the 2020 World Championships. They secured their Olympic ticket at the 2021 Lanzarote sailing competition.

Geurts lives in Schoten and studies psychology.

Awards
2016: Young Sailor of the Year award from Belgian Sailing
2019: Sailing Team of the Year award from Belgian Sailing

Notes

External links
 
 
 
 

2000 births
Living people
Belgian female sailors (sport)
Olympic sailors of Belgium
Sailors at the 2020 Summer Olympics – 49er FX
21st-century Belgian women